Saxaren may refer to:

 , a 1912-built Swedish steamship that now operates as MV Gustafsberg VII
 , a 1999-built passenger ferry in the fleet of the Waxholmsbolaget in Sweden

Ship names